The 1885–86 British Home Championship was the third annual international football tournament played between the British Home Nations. As common for the time, the matches were punctuated by some high scorelines and for the first time two teams finished level on points at the top of the table, thus sharing the championship as goal difference would not be introduced to separate teams for over nearly 90 years.

England and Scotland were the joint winners, with Wales third and Ireland last with zero points. The tournament began in February 1886 with a match between Wales and Ireland which Wales won comfortably 5–0. Ireland next played against England and Scotland, suffering two heavy defeats in which they conceded 13 goals for three in reply. With the three leaders therefore equal on points, England and Scotland played their match, sharing points in a 1–1 draw. Wales then played against England and Scotland in the final games but lost both, resulting in England and Scotland sharing the title.

Table

Results

Winning squads

References

Brit
Brit
Brit
Brit
Home Championship
British Home Championships